The naval Battle of Saint-Mathieu took place on 10 August 1512 during the War of the League of Cambrai, near Brest, France, between an English fleet of 25 ships commanded by Sir Edward Howard and a Franco-Breton fleet of 22 ships commanded by René de Clermont. It is possibly the first battle between ships using cannon through ports, although this played a minor role in the fighting. This was one of only two full-fledged naval battles fought by King Henry VIII's Tudor navy. During the battle, each navy's largest and most powerful ship — the Regent and the Marie-la-Cordelière (or simply Cordelière) — were destroyed in a large explosion aboard the latter.

Background
Although the War of the League of Cambrai, sometimes known as the War of the Holy League (among several alternative names) was largely an Italian war, nearly every significant power in Western Europe participated at one point or another, including France, England, and Brittany.  The latter was independent of France at the time, although the two were closely allied.

When war with France broke out in April 1512, England's Edward Howard was appointed admiral of a fleet sent by King Henry VIII to control the sea between Brest and the Thames estuary. Howard seized vessels of various nationalities on the pretext that they were carrying French cargoes. At the beginning of June, he escorted to Brittany an army which Henry sent to France under the command of Thomas Grey, 2nd Marquess of Dorset, with the hope of recovering Guyenne. Howard then raided Le Conquet and Crozon on the Breton coast. During June and July, Howard effectively controlled the English Channel and is said to have captured more than 60 vessels. By August, a French-Breton fleet had assembled at Brest; Howard moved to attack them.

Battle

Well informed about the Franco-Breton manoeuvres, the English surprised them at anchor. Unprepared and confronted by a superior fleet, all the French and Breton ships cut their anchor cables and spread their sails. By accident, about 300 guests, including some women, were visiting the Breton flagship Marie la Cordelière when it was attacked. In the hurry, Hervé de Portzmoguer, the captain of the ship, could not disembark them and the crew was thus reinforced by those "involuntary" combatants who, however, fought bravely.

The two main ships (Marie la Cordelière and Petite Louise) faced the enemy to cover the retreat of the rest of the fleet to the port of Brest. Under English fire, Marie la Cordelière— at 1,000 tons, one of the largest of her time—sailed towards the Regent, with 600 Tons  the largest and most powerful ship in the English navy. The Sovereign and the Mary James rushed to rescue the Regent and surrounded the Cordelière, while the superior fire of the Mary Rose badly damaged the Petite Louise which was forced to retreat. The Cordelière remained alone among the English fleet, with the exception of the small Nef-de-Dieppe which harassed the English ships. The Cordelières cannons dismasted both Sovereign and Mary James which became ungovernable and drifted in the Iroise Sea.

Hervé de Portzmoguer, also known as "Primauguet", the Breton captain of the Cordelière ordered the assault of the Regent. Grappling hooks were thrown and the two ships were tied together. The seamen of the Marie-la-Cordelière rushed on the Regent'''s deck which was constantly being reinforced by English ships transferring their crews on the Regent. The little Nef-de-Dieppe manoeuvered skillfully to bombard these new assailants. The deck of the Regent was covered by blood when, suddenly, the Cordelière exploded. The flames spread to the Regent and both ships sank. The crews of both ships were almost entirely annihilated. Only 20 wounded Breton sailors out of 1,250 were saved from the Cordelière and 60 out of 460 English from the Regent. Howard was devastated by the death of Thomas Knyvet, commander of the Regent, and vowed "that he will never see the King in the face till he hath revenged the death of the noble and valiant knight, Sir Thomas Knyvet."

Over the next two days, with the French fleet in Brest, the English fleet captured or destroyed thirty-two French vessels and recovered the valuable French anchors before returning to England.

Role in Breton culture
Brittany and France were still technically separate realms at the time, united only dynastically through the marriage of Duchess Anne to King Louis XII of France. The combination of the French and Breton fleets was thus the first significant military action in which the two countries fought together, twenty four years after the Battle of Saint-Aubin-du-Cormier (1488), the last battle between them. It thus became symbolic within Brittany of the unity between Brittany and France.

The destruction of the Breton ship Marie la Cordelière quickly became famous. French poets Humbert de Montmoret and Germain de Brie both wrote poems about it. The latter work presented such an exaggeratedly heroic version of the death of Hervé de Portzmoguer, that it occasioned a satirical response from Thomas More, leading to a literary battle between More and de Brie. The death of de Portzmoguer, on the day of Saint Lawrence (10 August), was later portrayed as a deliberate act of self-sacrificing heroism. He is supposed to have said «Nous allons fêter saint Laurent qui périt par le feu!». ("we will celebrate the feast of Saint Lawrence, who died by fire") before blowing up the ship to avoid its capture. In fact, there is no evidence that the explosion was intentional and early literary accounts make no such claims.Hervé de Portzmoguer at www.netmarine.net/  This version was commemorated by the Breton poet Théodore Botrel. A similar version is portrayed by Alan Simon in the song Marie la Cordelière from Anne de Bretagne'' (2008).

In 2018, the French government was searching for the wrecks of the sunken warships Cordelière and Regent.

Ships involved

Footnotes

References

External links

 Medal commemorating Marie de la Cordelière and the light cruiser Primauguet

1512 in France
Battles involving England
Battles involving France
Naval battles of the Italian Wars
History of Brest, France
Conflicts in 1512
16th-century military history of the Kingdom of England
England–France relations
Battles of the War of the League of Cambrai